Maytenus abbottii is a species of plant in the family Celastraceae. It is endemic to South Africa.  It is threatened by habitat loss.

This is a small gregarious tree favouring moist places such as stream banks in coastal lowland forest. There is a small population on the KwaZulu-Natal/Eastern Cape border.

References

Pondoland Centre Endemics and their Distribution Patterns

Flora of the Cape Provinces
Flora of KwaZulu-Natal
abbottii
Vulnerable plants
Taxonomy articles created by Polbot